Alstadhaug is a parish and small village in the municipality of Levanger in Trøndelag county, Norway. The name, which can be traced back to prehistoric times, is derived from the farm of Alstadhaug, located next to the Alstadhaug Church. The farm and church are both located on top of a hill overlooking great parts of Levanger and the Trondheimsfjord region. The etymology of Alstadaug is unknown, but the first element might be a personal name. It is located northeast of the village of Skogn, south of the village of Nesset, and west of the village of Momarka.

References

Villages in Trøndelag
Levanger